Scottish Specialist Transport and Retrieval (ScotSTAR) is the Scottish national service for adult, paediatric and neonatal patients. The service is run by the Scottish Ambulance Service and brings together NHS Scotland's three specialist transport and retrieval services: the Scottish Neonatal Transport Service (SNTS), the Transport of Critically Ill and Injured Children Service and the Emergency Medical Retrieval Service (EMRS). The service operates from a bespoke base near Glasgow and expects to be able to cater for 2,200 critically ill children and adults every year.

History

The Scottish National Paediatric Retrieval Service was established in April 2001. EMRS were formed in 2004. In November 2011, a strategic review project board looked at Scotland's patient transport arrangements and recommended harmonisation of the existing specialist services. In April 2013, the Scottish Ambulance Service approved the plans which were expected to cost £9.3million a year. The initiative become operational April 2014. In September 2015, the teams moved to a purpose-built facility that located beside Glasgow airport.

References

NHS Scotland
Scottish Government
2014 establishments in Scotland